Leiostyla corneocostata is a species of land snail in the family Lauriidae known commonly as the Madeiran land snail. It is endemic to Porto Santo Island in the Madeira archipelago.

This species is limited to a range of about 6 square kilometers on a single island. It lives in coastal habitat in the sea spray zone where it lives in rock cracks and under vegetation. The population is likely stable, but the species is threatened by development of the beach areas near its habitat.

References

Endemic fauna of Madeira
Molluscs of Madeira
Leiostyla
Gastropods described in 1878
Taxonomy articles created by Polbot